The yellow isthmus rat (Isthmomys flavidus) is a species of rodent in the family Cricetidae. It is found only in Panama. It was discovered by W. W. Brown Jr. on the southern slope of Volcan de Chiriqui (8° 49' N, 82° 32' W). He found it common in the upland forest from 1000 to 1500m, but no specimens were taken above or below these elevations (Bangs 1902; Goldman 1920; Goodwin 1946).  Museum records specify two isolated populations in western Panama, one at Cerro Colorado where R. Pine et al. collected in 1980 (8° 31' 60N, 81° 49' 0W) and at Cerro Hoya on the Azuero Peninsula by C. Handley in 1962 (7° 23' N, 80° 38' W).  The presence of I. flavidus or a closely allied form in Costa Rica is probable (Goodwin 1946), however, no specimens have been reported.  There are no currently known fossil records of Isthmomys (McKenna and Bell 1997).

References

Musser, G. G. and M. D. Carleton. 2005. Superfamily Muroidea. pp. 894–1531 in Mammal Species of the World a Taxonomic and Geographic Reference. D. E. Wilson and D. M. Reeder eds. Johns Hopkins University Press, Baltimore.

Isthmomys
Rodents of Central America
Mammals described in 1902
Talamancan montane forests
Taxonomy articles created by Polbot